'Geheimrat Dr. Oldenburg' is a German apple cultivar. It may also be known as 'Geheimrat Doktor Oldenburg', 'Geheimrat Oldenburg', or simply 'Oldenburg'. It is a quite different apple from the older Russian cultivar 'Duchess of Oldenburg', also sometimes known simply as 'Oldenburg'.

Hybrids
Cultivars that descend from Geheimrat Dr. Oldenburg include: Alkmene (Geheimrat Dr. Oldenburg × Cox's Orange Pippin); Apollo (Cox's Orange Pippin × Geheimrat Dr. Oldenburg); Clivia (Geheimrat Dr. Oldenburg × Cox's Orange Pippin);; Elektra (Cox's Orange Pippin x Geheimrat Doktor Oldenburg); Roba (Geheimrat Dr. Oldenburg x unknown); and possibly Dukat (Geheimrat Dr. Oldenburg × Cox's Orange Pippin).

See also
 List of apple cultivars

References

Apple cultivars
German apples